

1895-1919

References

19th century in LGBT history
20th century in LGBT history
LGBT
LGBT
LGBT
1910s
1910s